Selahattin Sağan (born 29 May 1961) is a Turkish former wrestler who competed in the 1984 Summer Olympics.

References

External links
 

1961 births
Living people
Olympic wrestlers of Turkey
Wrestlers at the 1984 Summer Olympics
Turkish male sport wrestlers
20th-century Turkish people